The  Association of Austrian Community Broadcasters (former name: Alliance of Community Radio Austria) is the alliance and lobbying group of the Austrian community radio and television stations. The association was founded in 1993 and has 16 members.

Members 
Full members are:
 Radio Agora (Klagenfurt)
 B138 (Kirchdorf an der Krems)
 Campus & City Radio 94.4 (Sankt Pölten)
 Radio Freequenns (Ennstal)
 Freirad 105.9 (Innsbruck)
 Radio Freistadt (Freistadt)
 Radio FRO (Linz) 
 Radio Salzkammergut (FRS; Bad Ischl)
 Radio Ypsilon (Hollabrunn)
 Radio Helsinki (Graz)
 Radio Orange (Vienna)
 Radio Proton (Dornbirn)
 Radiofabrik (Salzburg)
 Radio OP (Oberpullendorf)
  Okto (Vienna)
  FS1 (Salzburg)

Associate members are:
 Aufdraht (Langenlois) (Project radio)

See also 
 Alliance of Community Television Austria
 CRAOL (Ireland)
 Community Media Association (UK)
 Alliance for Community Media (US)
 World Association of Community Radio Broadcasters (Worldwide)

References

External links 
 
 https://www.freie-radios.online (On Demand Community Radio Library)

Cultural organisations based in Austria
Non-profit organisations based in Austria
Community radio organizations
Freedom of expression organizations